Peterson is an Irish pipe maker headquartered in Dublin and founded in 1865.

History

Friedrich and Heinrich Kapp, German immigrants to Ireland from Nuremberg, founded the famed Kapp Brothers store on Grafton Street, Dublin in 1865. Shortly thereafter, a Latvian immigrant, Charles Peterson, strolled into the Kapp workshop and declared that he could make better pipes than they could. Armed with an imaginative flair for pipes and a craftsman's background, Peterson not only proved himself correct, but became the third partner in the fledgling firm.

Originally based at 53 Grafton Street the business moved to 56 Lower Sackville Street (now O'Connell Street) on the corner with Bachelors Walk shortly after the Easter Rising. The name Kapp & Peterson Ltd can still be seen on the parapet of this building and the letters KP are formed in timber paneling on the shopfront.

Today, Peterson, run by Thomas Palmer, makes about 100,000 pipes annually, distributed all over the world. After Europe, the United States is the largest market with 12-15% of Peterson's production.

Pipes

Perhaps the most notable design from the Kapp and Peterson factory was Peterson's famed 'Dry System' pipes, patented in 1894. Featuring a small reservoir intended to collect moisture before it reaches the smoker, the 'System Pipe' is designed to create a drier and cooler smoke and discourage the formation of dottle. The System Pipe is still a consistent top seller for Peterson.

Another notable design from Peterson is the so-called "P-lip": a mouthpiece that directs smoke upwards towards the roof of the mouth instead of the tongue.  This is intended to produce a drier and less biting smoke than when smoke is directed at the tongue, as with other pipes.

Peterson offers many different model of pipes, including Aran, Donegal Rocky, Harp, Irish Army, Killarney, Rosslare Classic, Silver, and Shannon. The Peterson Dry System is available in select models such as Standard, Premier, Ebony, and Deluxe. Some models are available in both fishtail or P-Lip mouthpiece.

Tobacco
Peterson was a producer of various blends of pipe tobacco, including popular Aromatic blends (such as Connoisseur's Choice), Burley/Virginia-based blends (such as Sherlock Holmes), and English-style blends (such as Old Dublin). In July 2018, the Scandinavian Tobacco Group announced that they had acquired the Peterson pipe tobacco brand and business from Peterson's parent company Kapp & Peterson Limited. In the same month, Laudisi Enterprises announced the acquisition of the remaining Peterson operations, namely the pipe factory and retail store.

In creative works
In Act I of Samuel Beckett's Waiting for Godot the character Pozzo, who has lost his pipe, exclaims I've lost my Kapp and Peterson!

References

External links

Peterson article on Pipedia
The Peterson Pipe Collector

Pipe smoking
Pipe makers